Bjarni Fritzson (born 12 September 1980) is an Icelandic handball player who in 2008 played for Saint-Raphaël, Var handball in France. He was a reserve player on the men's handball team for Iceland at the 2008 Summer Olympics.

References

Recipients of the Order of the Falcon
1980 births
Living people
Bjarni Fritzson